Kovvur revenue division (or Kovvur division) is an administrative division in the East Godavari district of the Indian state of Andhra Pradesh. Development started in 2009 after Burugupalli Sesharao was elected as the Member of Legislative Assembly under Telugu Desam Party(TDP). He was elected twice for the developments that were made under his leadership. It is one of the 2 revenue divisions in the district which consists of 9 mandals under its administration. Kovvur is the divisional headquarters of the division.

Administration 
The mandals in the division are:

See also 
List of revenue divisions in Andhra Pradesh
List of mandals in Andhra Pradesh

References 

Revenue divisions in East Godavari district